Athyma reta, the Malay staff sergeant, is a nymphalid butterfly found in tropical and subtropical Asia. The species was first described by Frederic Moore in 1858.

References

Cited references

Athyma
Fauna of Pakistan
Butterflies of Asia
Butterflies of Indochina
Butterflies of Singapore
Butterflies described in 1858